Paola Andrea Álvarez Aguilar (born 10 September 1990) is a Bolivian footballer who plays as a goalkeeper for Spanish Segunda División Pro club Racing de Santander and the Bolivia women's national team.

Early life
Álvarez hails from the Santa Cruz Department.

Club career
Álvarez played for Brazilian club EC Taubaté.

International career
Álvarez played for Bolivia at senior level in two Copa América Femenina editions (2010 and 2018).

References

1991 births
Living people
Women's association football goalkeepers
Bolivian women's footballers
People from Santa Cruz Department (Bolivia)
Bolivia women's international footballers
Esporte Clube Taubaté players
Segunda Federación (women) players
Racing de Santander players
Bolivian expatriate footballers
Bolivian expatriate sportspeople in Brazil
Expatriate women's footballers in Brazil
Bolivian expatriate sportspeople in Spain
Expatriate women's footballers in Spain